Crime Doctor's Warning is a 1945 American mystery film directed by William Castle, and fourth in the Crime Doctor series of ten films produced between 1943 and 1949.

William Castle made it just before leaving to help make The Lady from Shanghai.

Plot summary

In this murder mystery, Coulter Irwin plays a returning World War II veteran named Clive Lake, with a problem explained by Dr Ordway, a psychiatrist, as 'transient amnesia'. The condition is characterized by headaches and no memory of the events. During a party in Lake's studio/apartment his beautiful girlfriend is found dead under a sofa, murdered. The police suspect Lake of the killing, but the Crime Doctor (Warner Baxter) is not so sure, and proceeds to investigate further.

Cast  
 Warner Baxter as Dr. Robert Ordway
 John Litel as Inspector Dawes
 Dusty Anderson as Connie Mace
 Coulter Irwin as Clive Lake
 Miles Mander as Frederick Malone
 John Abbott as Jimmy Gordon
 George Meeker as Attorney #1 (uncredited)
 Arthur Aylesworth as Attorney #2 (uncredited)
 J.M. Kerrigan as Robert MacPherson (uncredited) 
 Alma Kruger as Mrs. Lake (uncredited)

References

External links 
 
 
 
 

1945 films
Columbia Pictures films
Films directed by William Castle
1945 mystery films
American mystery films
American black-and-white films
Films scored by Paul Sawtell
Crime Doctor (character) films
1940s English-language films
1940s American films